Emrah Cebeci (born 14 April 1989) is a Turkish footballer who last played for Fostiras in the Football League (Greece) as a midfielder.

References

External links
 
 
 

1989 births
Living people
Turkish footballers
TFF First League players
Denizlispor footballers
Football League (Greece) players
Association football midfielders